The 1993 Segunda División B play-offs (Playoffs de Ascenso or Promoción de Ascenso) were the final playoffs for promotion from 1992–93 Segunda División B to the 1993–94 Segunda División. The four first placed teams in each of the four Segunda División B groups played the Playoffs de Ascenso and the four last placed teams in Segunda División were relegated to Segunda División B.

The teams play a league of four teams, divided into 4 groups.
The champion of each group is promoted to Segunda División.

Group A

Results

Group B

Results

Group C

Results

Group D

Results

Notes

External links
Segunda División Play-Off 1992-93 on Futbolme.com

Segunda División B play-offs
1993 Spanish football leagues play-offs
play